Nada Logan Stotland (born August 15, 1943) is an American psychiatrist and the 135th president of the American Psychiatric Association.

Education
Stotland received her undergraduate degree from the University of Chicago, where she later received her M.D. and also completed her residency.

Career
Stotland later joined the faculty of the University of Chicago, where she held multiple different positions, including Director of Psychiatric Consultation-Liaison Service and Director of Psychiatric Education. She later left this university to become medical coordinator for the Illinois Department of Mental Health, and after that, became the chair of psychiatry at the Illinois Masonic Medical Center. She served as the 135th president of the American Psychiatric Association from 2008 to 2009. As of July 2012, she held two professorships in two different departments at Rush Medical College, one in psychiatry and one in obstetrics and gynecology.

Work
Stotland has written about multiple topics in the field of psychiatry, including the alleged adverse mental health effects of abortion.

References

Presidents of the American Psychiatric Association
American psychiatrists
University of Chicago alumni
Living people
Pritzker School of Medicine alumni
University of Chicago faculty
Rush Medical College faculty
American women psychiatrists
1943 births
American women academics
21st-century American women